Nicolas Tournadre is a professor at the University of Provence specializing in morphosyntax and typology. He is a member of the LACITO lab of the CNRS.

His research mainly deals with ergative morphosyntax and grammatical semantics of tense, aspect, mood and evidentiality.

Tournadre specializes in Tibetic languages. Since 1986, he has carried out fieldwork on the Tibetan High Plateau, in the Himalayas and the Karakoram in China, India, Bhutan, Nepal and Pakistan.

Tournadre taught at the Institute of Oriental Languages (Inalco), at the Paris 8 University, at the University of Virginia and conducted research in the Tibet Academy of Social Sciences.

He obtained his Ph.D. in 1992 at the University of Paris III: Sorbonne Nouvelle under the supervision of Claude Hagège.

In 2000, he was awarded the CNRS Bronze medal.

Publications

Manual of Standard Tibetan with Sangda Dorje. (2 CDs), preface : Matthew Kapstein, Snowlion. Ithaca, New York. French Edition: Avec  Sangda Dorjé, 2003, Manuel de tibétain standard, langue et civilisation (préface de Claude Hagège), Paris, L’Asiathèque « Langues et mondes », 544 p., accompagné de 2 CD; 2nde édition révisée.
Avec Françoise Robin, Le grand livre des proverbes tibétains, Paris, Presses du Châtelet, 235 p., 2006
 L'ergativité en tibétain moderne, Peeters Publishers, 1996 
Comparaison des systèmes médiatifs de quatre dialectes tibétains (tibétain central, ladakhi, dzongkha et amdo)—In : L'énonciation médiatisée / Z. Guentchéva (Ed.) -- Louvain : Peeters, 1996, p. 195-213    
Avec Kesang Gyurmé, et Heather Stoddard Le clair miroir 1994
Avec Lhakpa Norbu Sherpa, Gyurme Chodrak and Guillaume Oisel, 2009, Sherpa-English and English-Sherpa Dictionary, with Literary Tibetan and Nepali equivalents, 295 p. Vajra Bookstore, Kathmandu. 
Le Prisme des langues, Paris, L’Asiathèque, 352 p., 2014. Second improved edition: 2016

References

External links
Nicolas Tournadre's personal website 

Tibetologists
Linguists from France
Living people
Academic staff of the University of Provence
1959 births
French National Centre for Scientific Research scientists